Nicolae Alexandru Soare (born 20 September 1991) is a Romanian long distance runner who specialises in the marathon. He competed in the men's marathon event at the 2016 Summer Olympics. He won silver medals in the 10,000 metres at the 2015 and 2017 Universiades. In 2020, he competed in the men's race at the 2020 World Athletics Half Marathon Championships held in Gdynia, Poland.

His personal best times are 14:00.35 minutes in the 5000 metres, achieved in Ponzano Veneto in June 2018; 28:25.38 minutes in the 10,000 metres, achieved in London in May 2018; 1:04:07 hours in the half marathon, achieved in March 2014 in Copenhagen; and 2:18:52 hours in the marathon, achieved at the 2016 Hamburg Marathon.

He was found positive for meldonium (doping substance) in 2016.

References

External links
 

1991 births
Living people
Romanian male long-distance runners
Romanian male marathon runners
Place of birth missing (living people)
Athletes (track and field) at the 2016 Summer Olympics
Olympic athletes of Romania
Universiade medalists in athletics (track and field)
Universiade silver medalists for Romania
Medalists at the 2015 Summer Universiade
Medalists at the 2017 Summer Universiade
Romanian sportspeople in doping cases